The thirteenth series of Made in Chelsea, a British structured-reality television programme began airing on 20 March 2017 on E4  and concluded on 29 May 2017 following eleven episodes. Ahead of the series, cast members Binky Felstead and Josh "JP" Patterson announced they were expecting a child. New cast members for this series include Daisy Robins, Ella Willis, Harry Baron, Mimi Bouchard and Sam Prince. Love Island contestant Tina Stinnes also made a brief return to the series having previously appearing in the seventh series of the show. This was the final series to feature original cast member Alexandra "Binky" Felstead, as well as Josh "JP" Patterson and Ollie Locke, who also announced their departures from the show. This episode also included the one-off return of Francesa "Cheska" Hull as she attended Binky's baby shower. It was also the last series to include cast members Akin Solanke-Caulker, Rosie Fortescue and Stephanie Pratt who did not return for fourteenth series. The series heavily focused on the rift between Jamie and Frankie following a number of obstacles getting in their way, the end of Olivia and Fredrik's relationship when his attention sways elsewhere, and JP and Binky planning their future with the imminent arrival of their baby. It also included Louise and Ryan taking their relationship to the next step, and Julius and Ella facing difficulties whilst trying to earn each other's trust.

Cast

Episodes

{| class="wikitable plainrowheaders" style="width:100%; background:#fff;"
! style="background:#F5A9D0;"| Seriesno.
! style="background:#F5A9D0;"| Episodeno.
! style="background:#F5A9D0;"| Title
! style="background:#F5A9D0;"| Original air date
! style="background:#F5A9D0;"| Duration
! style="background:#F5A9D0;"| UK viewers

|}

Ratings

External links

References

2017 British television seasons
Made in Chelsea seasons